The 1950 Individual Speedway World Championship was the fifth edition of the official World Championship to determine the world champion rider.

Speedway riders from New Zealand and Wales appeared in the World Championship for the first time. The title was won by Welshman Freddie Williams with the pivotal heat being the heat against Australian Graham Warren. Warren and Williams both unbeaten met in their third rides and as Warren challenged Williams for the lead he was forced to drop behind Williams. Warren then hit a bump and fell which cost him valuable points and the chance to win the title.

Ronnie Moore became the youngest finalist at the age of just 17.

Qualification (Championship Round)

Venues
9 events in Great Britain.

Scores
Top 16 qualify for World final, 17th & 18th reserves for World final

World final
22 September 1950
 London, Wembley Stadium
Change:  Arthur Forrest →  Mike Erskine

Podium
1950 Podium:
   Freddie Williams
   Wally Green
   Graham Warren

References

1950
Individual World Championship
Individual Speedway
Individual Speedway World Championship
Speedway competitions in the United Kingdom